Jim Kreider (born June 24, 1955) is an American Democratic Party politician who served as Speaker of the Missouri House of Representatives.

Kreider was born in Nuremberg, Germany.  He graduated from Nixa Public High School in 1973 and received a degree in agricultural business and economics from Southwest Missouri State University.

He was elected to the Missouri House of Representatives in 1992—the first Democrat to represent Christian County, Missouri, since 1904 and the first Democrat to represent heavily Republican southwest Missouri since 1955.

He became Speaker pro tempore in 1997 and Speaker in 2001.

References

1955 births
People from Nixa, Missouri
Speakers of the Missouri House of Representatives
Democratic Party members of the Missouri House of Representatives
Missouri State University alumni
20th-century American politicians
21st-century American politicians
Living people